Galimdzhan Mikhailovich Khayrulin (last name also spelled Khayrullin according to some sources; born 27 May 1974) is a Russian football manager and a former player.

External links
 

1974 births
Living people
Russian footballers
Russian expatriate footballers
Expatriate footballers in Poland
Świt Nowy Dwór Mazowiecki players
Expatriate footballers in Vietnam
SHB Da Nang FC players
Russian football managers
Russian expatriate football managers
Expatriate football managers in Vietnam
FC Shinnik Yaroslavl managers
FC Znamya Truda Orekhovo-Zuyevo managers
Association football midfielders
FC Spartak Kostroma players
FC Znamya Truda Orekhovo-Zuyevo players